The 9th Toronto International Film Festival (TIFF) took place in Toronto, Ontario, Canada between September 6 and September 15, 1984. The festival introduced Perspective Canada programme, devoted to Canadian films. The festival screened 225 feature films and more than half of them were Canadian films.

In 1984 Top 10 Canadian Films of All Time list was released. It was created by the votes of film critics, professors, fans and festival staff.<ref name="onlineencyclopedia">"Top 10 Canadian Films of All Time ," The Canadian Encyclopedia, 2012, URL accessed October 18, 2013.</ref>

Awards

Programme

Gala PresentationParis, Texas by Wim WendersPlaces in the Heart by Robert BentonStranger Than Paradise by Jim JarmuschBlood Simple by Joel Coen & Ethan CoenWhere the Green Ants Dream by Werner HerzogBoy Meets Girl by Leos CaraxAnother Country by Marek KanievskaFunny Dirty Little War by Héctor OliveraDiary for My Children by Márta MészárosThe Gold Diggers by Sally PotterWildrose by John HansonChoose Me by Alan RudolphThe Company of Wolves by Neil Jordan

Canadian PerspectiveAbortion: Stories From North and South, Gail SingerDemocracy on Trial: The Morgentaler Affair, Paul CowanLe jour S..., Jean Pierre Lefebvre Low Visibility, Patricia GrubenMario, Jean BeaudinThe Masculine Mystique, Giles Walker and John N. SmithMother's Meat and Freud's Flesh, Demitrios EstdelacropolisNext of Kin, Atom EgoyanThe Obsession of Billy Botski, The International Style and Springtime in Greenland, John PaizsRevolutions, Jean-Marc LarivièreSonatine, Micheline LanctôtUnfinished Business, Don OwenWalls, Tom ShandelA Woman in Transit (La Femme de l'hôtel), Léa PoolThe Years of Dreams and Revolt (Les Années de rêves), Jean-Claude Labrecque

Front & Centre
Front & Centre was a special one-off program, which screened culturally and artistically important films from throughout the entire history of Canadian cinema.Back to God's Country, David Hartford (1919)Lucky Corrigan, Lewis D. Collins (1936)Convicted, Leon Barsha (1937)Whispering City, Fedor Ozep (1947)The Bitter Ash, Larry Kent (1963)The Cat in the Bag (Le Chat dans le sac), Gilles Groulx (1964)When Tomorrow Dies, Larry Kent (1965)Winter Kept Us Warm, David Secter (1965)The Times That Are (Le Règne du jour), Pierre Perrault (1966)Don't Let It Kill You (Il ne faut pas mourir pour ça), Jean Pierre Lefebvre (1967)High, Larry Kent (1967)The River Schooners (Les Voitures d'eau), Pierre Perrault (1968)A Married Couple, Allan King (1969)The Only Thing You Know, Clarke Mackey (1971)Proxyhawks, Jack Darcus (1971)The Rowdyman, Peter Carter (1971)The Time of the Hunt (Le Temps d'une chasse), Francis Mankiewicz (1972)Wedding in White, William Fruet (1972)Dream Life (La Vie rêvée), Mireille Dansereau (1972)Dirty Money (La Maudite galette),  Denys Arcand (1972)Réjeanne Padovani, Denys Arcand (1973)The Last Betrothal (Les Dernières fiançailles), Jean Pierre Lefebvre (1973)Paperback Hero, Peter Pearson (1973)Skip Tracer, Zale Dalen (1977)The Old Country Where Rimbaud Died (Le Vieux pays ou Rimbaud est mort), Jean Pierre Lefebvre (1977)Why Shoot the Teacher?, Silvio Narizzano (1977)Blue Winter (L'Hiver bleu), André Blanchard (1979)A Scream from Silence (Mourir a tue-tête), Anne Claire Poirier (1979)Stations, William D. MacGillivray (1983)

DocumentariesIn Heaven There Is No Beer? by Les BlankBefore Stonewall'' by  Robert Rosenberg, Greta Schiller and John Scagliotti

Top 10 Canadian Films of All Time

References

External links
 Official site
 TIFF: A Reel History: 1976 - 2012
1984 Toronto International Film Festival at IMDb

1984
1984 film festivals
1984 in Toronto
1984 in Canadian cinema